Widerberg is a surname. Notable people with the surname include:

 Bo Widerberg (1930–1997), Swedish film director, writer, and actor
 Frans Widerberg (born 1934), Norwegian painter and graphic artist
 Henriette Widerberg (1796–1872), Swedish opera singer 
 Johan Widerberg (born 1974), Swedish actor
 Siv Widerberg (born 1931), Swedish writer and journalist